"Don't Cha Stop" is a song by the American rock band the Cars. The song appears on their 1978 debut album The Cars.

Reception
Rolling Stone critic Kit Rachlis said in his review of The Cars that "the songs bristle and -- in their harsher, more angular moments ('Bye Bye Love,' 'Don't Cha Stop') -- bray." On the Billboard review of The Cars, "Don't Cha Stop" was named one of the albums "[b]est cuts[.]"

Other appearances
After being released on the 1978 album The Cars, "Don't Cha Stop" saw release as the B-side to "My Best Friend's Girl" in the U.S. and Japan. That single hit #35 in America. However, in Europe, the song "Moving in Stereo" was used as the B-side instead.

"Don't Cha Stop" later appeared on the compilation album Just What I Needed: The Cars Anthology, as one of the six songs from The Cars to appear.

References

1978 songs
The Cars songs
Songs written by Ric Ocasek
Song recordings produced by Roy Thomas Baker